In September 1944, Nazi Germany briefly sought to establish an independent Macedonia, a puppet state in the territory of the Kingdom of Yugoslavia that had been occupied by the Kingdom of Bulgaria following the invasion of Yugoslavia in April 1941. When Soviet Union forces approached the borders of Bulgaria near the end of August 1944, Bulgaria declared neutrality and briefly sought to negotiate with the Western Allies. As the Bulgarian government was not impeding the withdrawal of German forces from Bulgaria or Romania, the Soviet Union treated it with suspicion. On 2 September, a new pro-Western government took power in Sofia, only to be replaced a week later by a pro-Soviet government after a Fatherland Front–led revolt. However, on 5 September 1944, the Soviets declared war on Bulgaria.

The Germans turned to Ivan Mihailov to implement the scheme. Mihailov was a Bulgarophile right-wing politician and former leader of the Internal Macedonian Revolutionary Organization (IMRO) who had been engaged in terrorist activity in Yugoslav and Greek Macedonia. Mihailov had become leader of IMRO in 1927 and under his leadership the organisation had joined forces with the Croatian Ustaše in 1929. The two organisations had planned and executed the assassination of King Alexander of Yugoslavia in 1934. After the Bulgarian military coup d'état in the same year, IMRO was banned by the Bulgarian authorities. Mihailov fled to Turkey and then Italy, where most of the Ustaše were also in exile. After the invasion of Yugoslavia in 1941, Mihailov had moved to Zagreb where he had acted as an advisor to Ante Pavelić. In January 1944 he had successfully lobbied the Germans to arm some Ohrana supporters and have them placed under Schutzstaffel (SS) command in Greek Macedonia, which had also been in part annexed by Bulgaria in 1941.

In 1928, Mihailov proposed a plan calling for the unification of the region of Macedonia into a single state, that would be autonomous from Bulgaria. He was a proponent of a pro-Bulgarian United Macedonian multi-ethnic state, calling it: "Switzerland of the Balkans". During the last phase of the Second World War he tried to realise his plan with German political collaboration, however he abandoned the implementation of this idea due to the lack of real military support. Despite this, an independent state was declared by Macedonian nationalists on 8 September 1944. Without the means to make the state a reality, this pretence dissolved as soon as the Yugoslav Partisans asserted their control following the withdrawal of German troops from the area by mid-November. This event marked the defeat of the Bulgarian nationalism and the victory of the Macedonism in the area.

Background
The Kingdom of Bulgaria officially joined the Axis Powers on 1 March 1941 but remained passive during the invasion of Yugoslavia and the majority of the invasion of Greece. The Yugoslav government surrendered on 17 April 1941 and the Greek government surrendered on 30 April 1941. Before the Greek government capitulated, on 20 April, the Bulgarian Army entered Greece and Yugoslavia with the goal of gaining access to the Aegean Sea in Thrace and Eastern Macedonia. The Bulgarians occupied much of what is today the Republic of North Macedonia as well as parts of Southern Serbia and Northern Greece. Unlike Germany and Italy, Bulgaria officially annexed the occupied areas, which had long been a target of Bulgarian nationalism on 14 May 1941. However, the Germans regarded this annexation as inconclusive and imposed limited sovereignty of Bulgaria over the occupied territories.

At that time, among the local population the pro-Bulgarian feelings still prevailed and the Macedonian national identity hardly existed. Because of that, initially the Bulgarians were welcomed as liberators. In this way Vardar Macedonia was the only region where the Yugoslav communist leader Josip Broz Tito had not developed a strong Partisan movement in until the Autumn of 1943.

During the Summer of 1943 in the Battle of Kursk for the first time a German strategic offensive had been halted and though the Soviet Army had succeeded in its first successful strategic summer offensives of the war. In the late July, after Italy has failed lot of campaign during Allies invasion, Mussolini was arrested by the king Victor Emmanuel III and spirited off to the island of Ponza. The situation of the Axis Powers became crucial. As result in the early August 1943, Ivan Mihailov left Zagreb for Germany where he was invited to visit the main headquarters of Hitler. Here he spoke to Adolf Hitler and other top German leaders. The content of the conversations is almost unknown. Additionally, in Sofia talks were held between high-ranking functionaries of the SS and the IMRO Central Committee members.

On 14 August 1943, a few days before his death, King Boris III also met with Adolf Hitler in Germany. During the talks, Hitler has argued the need an autonomous Macedonia to be created into the frames of the Bulgarian Kingdom, with Mihailov as its head. Boris III agreed with this proposal. Hitler also desperately wanted to convince Boris III to declare war on the Soviet Union and to transfer most of the Bulgarian army on the Eastern and on the Italian fronts. For that purpose the IMRO militias had to take the functions of the Bulgarian army in the Newly liberated lands in Greece and Yugoslavia. After Boris' subsequent death this plans failed. However, it was apparent that Ivan Mihailov had broader plans, which envisaged the creation of independent Macedonian state under German control. IMRO began also active to organise pro-Bulgarian militias in former Italian and German occupation zones in Greece. Bulgaria looked with anxiety on this activities of Mihailov, because it feared that his plan to form "Independent Macedonia" could succeed. Aiming to put him under control Bulgaria set aside his death sentence and he was proposed to return to the country and to take a leading position in Vardar Macedonia, but Mihailov rejected that proposal.

Meanwhile, the Bulgarians, who staffed the new provinces with corrupted officials from Bulgaria proper began to lose the public confidence. This process accelerated after the King's dead which concurred with the capitulation of Italy and the Soviet victories over the Nazi Germany in the Summer of 1943. On this basis, the Yugoslav communists, who supported the recognition of a separate Macedonian nation, managed to organize an earnest armed resistance against the Bulgarian forces in the Autumn of 1943. Many former IMRO right-wing activists assisted the authorities in fighting Tito's partizans.

In the August 1944, the Soviet Army was approaching the Balkans. On the other hand, at the same time, the Yugoslav Partisans, who "articulated the slogan of Macedonian unification", increased their activities in Macedonia. As result, the Anti-fascist Assembly for the National Liberation of Macedonia (ASNOM) declared the foundation of the Macedonian state on 2 August 1944. The state was proclaimed in the Bulgarian occupation zone of Yugoslavia. On 23 August, Romania left the Axis Powers, declared war on Germany, and allowed Soviet forces to cross its territory to reach Bulgaria. At that time, Bulgaria made a drive to find separate peace, repudiating any alliance with Nazi Germany, and declared neutrality on 26 August. However, its secret negotiations with the Allies in Cairo, to allow it to retain the annexed areas in Greece and Yugoslavia failed, because Bulgaria was "not in a position to argue".

Proposed state

At that time the Partisans were active in western Macedonia, then under German control, as part of an Albanian puppet-state. Using the situation the Nazis sent a plenipotentiary to meet with Ivan Mihailov, the leader of the IMRO at that time. Mihailov was in Zagreb serving as an adviser to Ante Pavelić where he was pushing for the formation of volunteer units to operate in what is now the Greek province of Macedonia under Schutzstaffel (SS) command. He, as the most of the right wing followers of the former IMRO, were pro-Bulgarian orientated, and did not support the existence of Communist Yugoslavia. The Germans were becoming increasingly overwhelmed and, in a last-ditch effort, tried to establish a Macedonian puppet-state. That was the only alternative, instead to leave it to Bulgaria, which was switching the sides. At the evening on 3 September, Mihailov was sent to Sofia, to negotiate here with the Bulgarian authorities and his comrades. When on 5 September, the Soviet Union declared war on Bulgaria Mihailov was transported urgently from Sofia to Skopje.

Contacts were established here with another IMRO leader, Hristo Tatarchev who was offered the position of president of the proposed state. Negotiations were also held with the Macedonian Partisans, mediated by the Bulgarian minister of Internal Affairs Alexandar Stanishev. In spite of all of this, Mihailov's arrival came too late and all negotiations failed. On the next day, 6 September, Mihailov declined the plan for inability to gain support. The failure led to ordering German withdrawal from Greece the same day, when Mihailov and his wife were also evacuated from Skopje. Bulgaria immediately ordered its troops to prepare for withdrawal from former Yugoslavia and on 8 September, the Bulgarians changed sides and joined the Soviet Union. This turn of the events, put the Bulgarian 5th. Army stationed in Macedonia, in a difficult situation, surrounded by German divisions, but it fought its way back to the old borders of Bulgaria.

Nevertheless, the same day 8 September, right-wing IMRO nationalists declared independence; They had foreseen the future of this independent Macedonian state under the protectorate of the Third Reich. The state had to have a Bulgarian character and its official language to be Bulgarian. However, the self-proclaimed state was left "virtually defenseless" following the withdrawal of German troops.

Aftermath

The German command in Skopje did not support the "independent" Macedonian state as their forces withdrew from the region. In the chaos, it tried only to use the new-formed  "Macedonian committees" as local police services. Their members were people as Vasil Hadzhikimov, Stefan Stefanov, Spiro Kitinchev, Dimitar Gyuzelov and Dimitar Tchkatrov, all of them vormer activists of the IMRO, the Macedonian Youth Secret Revolutionary Organization and the Bulgarian Action Committees. In between, in the early October 1944, three Bulgarian armies under the leadership of the new Bulgarian pro-Soviet government, together with the Red Army reentered occupied Yugoslavia. The Bulgarian forces entered Yugoslavia on the basis of an agreement between Josip Broz Tito and the Bulgarian partisan leader Dobri Terpeshev signed on 5 October in Craiova, Romania with the mediation of the USSR.

Despite some difficulties in cooperation between the two forces, the Bulgarians worked in conjunction with the Yugoslav Partisans in Macedonia, and managed to delay the German withdrawal through the region by ten to twelve days. By mid-November all German formations had withdrawn to the west and north and the Partisans had established military and administrative control of the region. However, under the political pressure of the Partisans, after the liberation of Vardar Macedonia, the Second and Fourth Bulgarian armies were forced to retreat back to the old borders of Bulgaria at the end of November. The ASNOM became operational in December, shortly after the German retreat. The Macedonian national feelings were already ripe at that time as compared to 1941, but some researchers argue that even then, it was questionable whether the Macedonian Slavs considered themselves to be a nationality separate from the Bulgarians. Subsequently, to wipe out the remaining Bulgarophile sentiments, the new Communist authorities persecuted the right-wing nationalists with the charges of "great-Bulgarian chauvinism". The next task was also to break up all the pro-Bulgarian organisations that opposed the idea of Yugoslavia. So even left-wing politicians were imprisoned and accused of being pro-Bulgarian oriented. Seeing that he had little support, Mihailov went into hiding, first moving from Croatia to Austria and eventually to Spain and finally to Italy where remained until he died in 1990.

See also 
 Macedonian question
 Autonomy for Macedonia and Adrianople regions, a nationalist concept ca. end of 19th century
 Independent Macedonia (IMRO), a nationalist concept in the interwar period
 United Macedonia, an irredentist concept ca. 1990s
 Military history of Bulgaria during World War II
 Communist resistance in Vardar Macedonia

Notes

References 
 
 
 
 
 
 
 
 
 IMRO (United). Documents and materials, book I and II, Ivan Katandzhiev, Skopje, 1991, 1992
 History of Bulgaria, Sofia, 1994
 For independent state Croatia: common struggle of the Croats and Macedonians, Wien, 1932

Further reading
 Das makedonische Jahrhundert: von den Anfängen der nationalrevolutionären Bewegung zum Abkommen von Ohrid 1893-2001, Stefan Troebst, Oldenbourg Verlag, 2007, S. 229–237.
 Македонска нацијa, 02 Март 2011 г. Ванчо Михајлов не ја исполнил задачата на Хитлер, Стефан Требст. (Mk.)
 "Führerbefehl!" - Adolf Hitler und die Proklamation eines unabhängigen Makedonien (September 1944). Eine archivalische Miszelle, Troebst, Stefan, Serial Osteuropa 52, 2002, pp. 491–501.
 "Сите българи заедно" - Иван Михайлов и Третият райх. Цочо В. Билярски. (Bg.)

Abandoned projects of Nazi Germany
Yugoslav Macedonia in World War II
Proposed countries
History of Macedonia (region)
1944 in Bulgaria
Internal Macedonian Revolutionary Organization
Bulgaria–Yugoslavia relations
States and territories established in 1944
States and territories disestablished in 1944
Axis powers
Former republics